Zhang Lin (born January 6, 1987) is a retired Chinese competitive male swimmer. He is an Olympic silver medalist, world champion, and the current world-record holder in the 800 metre freestyle.

Early and personal life 

On January 6, 1987, Zhang was born in Haidian Deistrict, Beijing City. He is the second son to his parents Zhang Zhongquan (张仲泉) and Zhang Fenglan (张凤兰). He has an elder brother Zhang Cong (张琮) who is five years his senior. Both of his parents are employed by a property management company.

Zhang began swimming at the age of seven. In 2000, he decided to be a professional swimmer. His swimming idol is Australian Grant Hackett.

Zhang is an alumnus of Beijing 101 Middle School. Since 2016, Zhang has been studying in Beijing Sport University.

Swimming

Career
Zhang specialized in the 200 m, 400 m, 800 m and 1500 m freestyle events. Zhang was selected for the national team in 2002.

At the 2003 World Aquatics Championships, he was the only Chinese male swimmer to reach the individual finals, finishing in eighth place. In 2005, he broke China's 400 freestyle record at the National Games, and was crowned 200 and 1,500 freestyle champion.

Zhang Lin won a silver medal in the men's 400 meter freestyle at the 2008 Summer Olympics in Beijing with a time of 3:42.44, 0.58 seconds behind gold medalist South Korean Park Tae-hwan, and making him at the time the third fastest 400 meter freestyler in history (and setting a Chinese Record in the process). Zhang's silver was the first Olympic swimming medal ever by a Chinese male swimmer.

At 2009 World Aquatics Championships in Rome, Zhang won a bronze medal in the men's 400 meter freestyle and a gold medal in the men's 800 meter freestyle (7:32.12); this was a world record and a first by a Chinese male in a world swimming competition in the past 73 years, and was also the penultimate men's swimming world record achieved in the high-tech slick-suit The high-tech slick-suits were immediately banned thereafter from official-sanctioned major competition use under new FINA regulations after the 2009 World Championships. Zhang was named 2009 Pacific Rim Male Swimmer of the Year by ’‘Swimming World Magazine’‘, it's also the first Chinese male swimmer to win this award.

Zhang was coached by Zhang Yadong and Chen Yinghong. He was also coached by Australian Denis Cotterell since late 2007, who was the former coach of distance champion Grant Hackett. In the fall of 2011, he trained with Dave Salo at the Trojan Swim Club for a 52-day training camp.

In 2010, Zhang found that he suffered a rare kind of asthma, and it led his decline. He missed the 2012 Summer Olympics.

Zhang announced his retirement around 2013. He sometimes attends some sport activities.

Major achievements
2005 World Championships - 6th 1500 m freestyle;
2005 National Games - 1st 200 m/ 400 m/ 1500 m freestyle;
2007 World Championships - 6th 200 m freestyle;
2008 Summer Olympics - 2nd (silver medalist) 400 m freestyle;
2009 World Aquatics Championships - 3rd (bronze medalist) 400 m freestyle; 3:41.35
2009 World Aquatics Championships - 1st (gold medalist) 800 m freestyle; world record 7:32.12

See also
List of Chinese records in swimming
List of world records in swimming
World record progression 800 metres freestyle

References

External links
  Zhang Lin _ Netease sports database - Comprehensive information on historical data, news, pictures, video, and personal data

1987 births
Living people
Chinese male freestyle swimmers
Olympic silver medalists for China
Olympic swimmers of China
Swimmers from Beijing
Swimmers at the 2008 Summer Olympics
World record holders in swimming
World Aquatics Championships medalists in swimming
Medalists at the FINA World Swimming Championships (25 m)
Asian Games medalists in swimming
Swimmers at the 2006 Asian Games
Swimmers at the 2010 Asian Games
Medalists at the 2008 Summer Olympics
Asian Games gold medalists for China
Asian Games silver medalists for China
Asian Games bronze medalists for China
Olympic silver medalists in swimming
Medalists at the 2006 Asian Games
Medalists at the 2010 Asian Games
20th-century Chinese people
21st-century Chinese people